Henry Bollmann Condy (8 July 1826 — 24 September 1907) was an English chemist and industrialist best noted for giving his name to the popular 19th and 20th century disinfectants Condy's Crystals and Condy's Fluid.

Condy was born in London. His mother inherited a chemical factory in Battersea  from a Hungarian chemist named Dr Bollmann. A company was eventually set up in London that was known variously as Bollmann Condy and Co., Condy and Co., Condy Brothers and Co., Condy's Fluid Co., and Condy and Mitchell Ltd. The company began as a firm of vinegar manufacturers and drysalters. It later moved into essential oil, vitriol and disinfectant production. Condy became a partner in the company in 1854.

Condy had an interest in disinfectants and marketed products such as "ozonised water". He developed and patented "Condy's fluid" in 1857. Condy’s fluid was a disinfectant solution of alkaline manganates and permanganates that could be taken internally or used externally. It had various indications including the treatment and prevention of scarlet fever. A more stable crystalline version of Condy's fluid was subsequently developed and marketed as Condy's Crystals or Cond's powder. The fluid and crystals were both manufactured at the company’s works in Battersea between 1867 and 1897. The factory was taken over by Morgan Crucible.

He died in Folkestone, Kent.

Footnote 

Advertisements that appeared in the Kingston newspaper The Gleaner during the 1860s and 1870s claimed that Condy's fluid was used 
 To prevent the communication of Infectious Diseases
 To purify Sick Rooms and the Wards of Hospitals and Crowded Places.
 To disinfect water
 To purify Stagnant Water
 To purify Cattle Dog and where offensive matter lies about.
 To ensure Purity of Water employed for drinking -which frequently contains much organic matter
 To purify fever wards or -in cases of death- from a contagious disease or to prevent offensive effluvia arising from a dead body
 To purify sick persons
 To deprive Night-chairs of offensive odour
 To purify the atmosphere of Rooms in which there are Dead for the Visits of Undertakers and Jurymen
 To sweeten Musty odours
 To destroy Canker and Fungus on Trees
 To purify Bilge Water in a Ship's Well To parity with the Interior or Hold of a Ship
 To extirpate from Fowl-Houses and to preserve the health of Fowl
 To disinfect the Sail while emptying Cess-pools

References 

Pamphlets by Condy
Disinfection and the Prevention of Disease; Henry Bollmann Condy (1862)
On the purification of water & air,: And the use of the alkaline permanganates as purifying agents ; Henry Bollmann Condy ; Publisher: J.W. Davies (1862)
Patent Disputes
Chemical News and Journal of Physical Science (1867)- Page 193

External links 
Original Advertisements
 1863 Magazine Advertisement for Condy's Patent Ozonized Water
 The Gleaner, Saturday, October 6, 1866 (Kingston, Kingston)

Notable Commendations
 Praise for Condy's Ozonized Water from Charles Darwin
 Nursing Record June 16, 1892, pg 493, an editorial describing the high place of Condy's products.

Condy, H.B.
19th-century English businesspeople
1826 births
1927 deaths
19th-century chemists